The School of Business and Law is part of the University of Brighton. It offers undergraduate and postgraduate degrees and has about 500 full-time students, 1,000 part-time students and 120 members of academic staff. It provides teaching, research and consultancy in accounting, economics, finance, business, human resources, management, marketing and law.

Formerly part of Brighton Technical College, the school has been teaching business and management courses since the 1960s. It is located in Elm House on the Moulsecoomb campus, two kilometers from Brighton city centre.

The school runs a number of accredited degrees which lead to some exemptions from professional examinations. Professional bodies affiliated to the school include the Association of Chartered Certified Accountants, the Chartered Institute of Management Accountants, the Chartered Institute of Personnel and Development, the Chartered Institute of Purchasing & Supply, the Chartered Management Institute, the Institute of Chartered Accountants in England and Wales, and The Law Society.

The School of Business and Law hosts two research centres: the Centre for Research in Innovation Management (CENTRIM) and the Centre for Research on Management and Employment (CROME). In the latest Research Assessment Exercise (2008), it was ranked as one of the top 15 UK business schools in terms of world-leading research outputs. 70% of the school's business and management research was found to be of international standing or higher.

References

External links
 School of Business and Law
 University of Brighton
 Centre for Research in Innovation Management (CENTRIM)
 Centre for Research on Management and Employment (CROME)

University of Brighton
Business schools in England